The Revenge of Dracula is a horror novel by British writer Peter Tremayne (pseudonym of Peter Berresford Ellis).  It was first published in the United Kingdom in 1978 by Bailey Brothers & Swinfen.  The first United States edition was published by Donald M. Grant, Publisher, Inc. in 1978 in an edition of 1,250 copies which were signed by the author and the illustrator, Dan Green.  It is the second book in Tremayne's Dracula Lives trilogy.

Plot introduction
The novel concerns the story of Count Dracula in England and is set before the events in Bram Stoker's novel Dracula.

Sources

1978 British novels
British horror novels
Dracula novels
Works by Peter Berresford Ellis
Works published under a pseudonym
Vampire novels